12th OTO Awards

SND, Bratislava, Slovakia

Overall winner  Petra Polnišová

Hall of Fame  Dušan Gabáni

Život Award  Jozef Kubáni

◄ 11th | 13th ►

The 12th OTO Awards, honoring the best in Slovak popular culture for the year 2011, took time and place on March 9, 2012 at the Opera of the Slovak National Theater in Bratislava. The ceremony broadcast live RTVS on Jednotka. The hosts of the show were Marián Čekovský and Michal Hudák.

Winners and nominees

Main categories
 Television

{| class=wikitable style="background:white"
! style=background:#F0DC82 width=273| News Host
! style=background:#F0DC82 width=273| Sports Host or Commentator
|-
| scope=row valign=top|
★ Lucia Barmošová
 Andrea Pálffy (née Belányiová)
 Miriam Šmahel (née Kalisová) 
| scope=row valign=top|
★ Peter Varinský
 Lenka Čviriková (née Hriadelová)
 Marcel Merčiak
|-
! style=background:#F0DC82 width=273| Journalist
! style=background:#F0DC82 width=273| Entertainer
|-
| scope=row valign=top|
★ Patrik Herman
 Zlatica Švajdová (née Puškárová)
 Erika Barkolová
| scope=row valign=top|
★ Martin Rausch 
 Viliam Rozboril 
 Adela Banášová 
|-
! style=background:#F0DC82 width=273| Drama Actor
! style=background:#F0DC82 width=273| Drama Actress
|-
| scope=row valign=top|
★ Ján Koleník
 Roman Luknár
 Janko Kroner
| scope=row valign=top|
★ Diana Mórová
 Zuzana Tlučková
 Emília Vášáryová
|-
! style=background:#F0DC82 width=273| Comedy Actor
! style=background:#F0DC82 width=273| Comedy Actress
|-
| scope=row valign=top|
★ Lukáš Latinák
 Ľuboš Kostelný
 Alexander Bárta
| scope=row valign=top|
★ Petra Polnišová
 Helena Krajčiová
 Monika Hilmerová
|-
! style=background:#F0DC82 width=273| Program 
! style=background:#F0DC82 width=273| Show
|-
| scope=row valign=top|
★ Srdce pre deti – JOJ 
 Česko Slovensko má talent – JOJ 
 Legendy Popu – STV
| scope=row valign=top|
★ Partička – Markíza Modré z neba – Markíza
 5 proti 5 – STV
|-
! colspan=2 style=background:#F0DC82 width=546| Series
|-
| colspan=2 align=center|
★ Panelák – JOJ''' Profesionáli – JOJ Hoď svišťom – JOJ 
|}

 Music

Others

Reception
TV ratings
The show has received a total audience of more than 464,000 viewers, making it the second most watched television program within prime time in the region, yet the lowest rated in the TV poll's history.

References
 
 
 
 
 
 
 
 

External links
 Archive > OTO 2011 – 12th edition  (Official website)
 Winners and nominees (at Topky.sk'')

OTO Awards
2011 in Slovak music
2011 in Slovak television
2011 television awards